Tian Bingyi (born July 30, 1963) is a former badminton star from China. Though he played some singles internationally early in his career, he soon specialised in men's doubles.

Career
From the mid 1980s to the early 1990s Tian and his regular partner Li Yongbo won numerous top tier international titles. They were contemporaries and rivals of the famous Korean team of Park Joo-bong and Kim Moon-soo, largely dividing the world's biggest championships between them for about eight seasons. Among many tournaments around the world Tian and Li captured consecutive World Championships in 1987 and 1989, the prestigious All-England Championship in 1987, 1988, and 1991, and five Danish Opens between 1984 and 1991. they also played on Chinese Thomas Cup (men's international teams) that won consecutive world team titles in 1986, 1988, and 1990. Late in their partnership they won a bronze medal in men's doubles at the 1992 Olympic Games in Barcelona.

Tian is married to Zhou Jihong, a diver and Olympic champion.

Achievements

Olympic Games 
Men's doubles

World Championships 
Men's doubles

World Cup 
Men's doubles

Asian Games 
Men's doubles

IBF World Grand Prix 
The World Badminton Grand Prix sanctioned by International Badminton Federation (IBF) since from 1983 to 2006.

Men's doubles

References

External links
 
 
 
 Biography of Tian Bingyi 

1963 births
Living people
Badminton players at the 1992 Summer Olympics
Olympic badminton players of China
Olympic bronze medalists for China
Olympic medalists in badminton
Badminton players from Wuhan
Asian Games medalists in badminton
Badminton players at the 1986 Asian Games
Badminton players at the 1990 Asian Games
Chinese male badminton players
Badminton players at the 1988 Summer Olympics
Medalists at the 1992 Summer Olympics
Asian Games gold medalists for China
Asian Games silver medalists for China
Medalists at the 1986 Asian Games
Medalists at the 1990 Asian Games
World No. 1 badminton players